Transforming acidic coiled-coil-containing protein 3 is a protein that in humans is encoded by the TACC3 gene.

The function of this gene has not yet been determined; however, it is speculated that it may be involved in cell growth and differentiation.  Expression of this gene is up-regulated in some cancer cell lines, and in embryonic day 15 in mice.

References

Further reading